Romans Kuklins (born 13 September 1974) is a Latvian boxer. He competed in the men's heavyweight event at the 1996 Summer Olympics.

References

1974 births
Living people
Latvian male boxers
Olympic boxers of Latvia
Boxers at the 1996 Summer Olympics
Sportspeople from Riga
Heavyweight boxers